Farhad Shamsi oghlu Badalbeyli (born 1947) is an Azerbaijani pianist and composer. He was awarded the title, People's Artists of the Azerbaijan SSR (1978), the People's Artist of the USSR (1990), and laureate of the State Prize of the Azerbaijan SSR (1986).

Biography 
Farhad Badalbeyli was born in 1947 in Baku, Azerbaijan SSR; the son of Leyla and Shamsi Badalbeyli. His uncle is Afrasiyab Badalbeyli. 

In 1968, he tied with Viktoria Postnikova in winning the 4th Vianna da Motta International Music Competition in Lisbon. Since 1991, he has been the rector of the Baku Academy of Music, where he has taught since 1971.

He is a member of the board of the Azerbaijani Community of Nagorno-Karabakh.

References

External links 
 
 Farhad Badalbeyli profile, hexagone.net; accessed 12 January 2017.

Azerbaijani classical pianists
Badalbeylim Farhad
Azerbaijani pianists
Azerbaijani composers
Baku Academy of Music alumni
1947 births
Living people
Date of birth missing (living people)
21st-century classical pianists
Badalbeyli family
People's Artists of the Azerbaijan SSR